Minuscule 2816 (in the Gregory-Aland numbering), α597 (in von Soden numbering), formerly labelled as 4ap in all catalogs, but subsequently renumbered by Aland, is a Greek minuscule manuscript of the New Testament, paleographically had been assigned to the 15th century.

Description 

The codex contains a complete text of the Acts of the Apostles, Pauline epistles, and General epistles (the Pauline epistles preceding the General), on 287 parchment leaves (15.4 by 11 cm) in elegant minuscule. The text is written in one column per page, 17-19 lines per page. It contains 

Hardly written by several hands, and full of contractions. 

The order of books; Acts of the Apostles, Pauline epistles, and Catholic epistles.

Text 
The Greek text of the Gospels is a representative of the Byzantine text-type. Aland placed it in Category V.

In James 1:12 it has textual variant ο θεος (God) along with the manuscripts 33vid, 323, 945, 1739, vf, syrp, against the Byzantine ο κυριος (the Lord).

In Hebrews 3:3 it reads μεχρι  τελους κατασχωμεν βεβαιαν for κατασχωμεν. The reading is supported only by itc.

History of the codex 

The manuscript belonged to the monastery of the Dominican Order. It was borrowed by Desiderius Erasmus and used by him in his edition of the Novum Testamentum (1516). Sometimes he used some of its marginal readings instead of main text readings (e.g. Acts 8:37; 15:34; 24:6-8). In result some of its readings became a part of the Textus Receptus. 

It was examined by Battier (for John Mill), Wettstein.

Currently the codex is located at the Basel University Library (Cod. A.N.IV.5), at Basel.

See also 

 List of New Testament minuscules (2001–)
 Textual criticism
 Biblical manuscript

References

Further reading 

 Hermann von Soden, Die Schriften des Neuen Testaments, in ihrer ältesten erreichbaren Textgestalt hergestellt auf Grund ihrer Textgeschichte, Verlag von Arthur Glaue, Berlin 1902-1910. 
 C. C. Tarelli, Erasmus’s Manuscripts of the Gospels, JTS XLIV (1943), 155-162.

External links 
 

Greek New Testament minuscules
15th-century biblical manuscripts